Martin Luther King Junior Morais Simões, known as Luther King (born 21 July 1996) is a Portuguese footballer who plays as a forward.

Football career
Born in Viana do Castelo, Luther King was named after the famous African American activist, a hero of his father. He began his career in the youth ranks of S.L. Benfica, and also had a spell in Italy with U.C. Sampdoria in 2014 before joining S.C. Olhanense in February 2015 on a deal for the rest of the season. His transfer was one of several at the time between the two clubs. On 18 February, he made his professional debut in a 1–0 Segunda Liga loss at  C.S. Marítimo B, replacing Adílson for the last 12 minutes.

Subsequently, Luther King played in the third tier of Portuguese football with G.D. Tourizense, S.U. 1º de Dezembro, F.C. Barreirense and A.R. São Martinho. In January 2018, he joined Spanish Tercera División club AD Ceuta FC, and received media attention for his name. He returned to his country's third level in June, with S.G. Sacavanense and six months later Sertanense FC.

References

External links

Stats and profile at LPFP 

1996 births
People from Viana do Castelo
Living people
Portuguese footballers
Association football forwards
Portuguese expatriate footballers
Expatriate footballers in Italy
Portuguese expatriate sportspeople in Italy
S.C. Olhanense players
Liga Portugal 2 players
Segunda Divisão players
G.D. Tourizense players
F.C. Barreirense players
AD Ceuta FC players
Sportspeople from Viana do Castelo District